Theaetetus (Θεαίτητος) is a Greek name which could refer to:

 Theaetetus (mathematician) (c. 417 BC – 369 BC), Greek geometer
 Theaetetus (dialogue), a dialogue by Plato, named after the geometer
 Theaetetus (crater), a lunar impact crater
 Theaetetus (poet) (fl. 3rd century BC), Greek poet
 Theaetetus of Cyrene (Θεαίτητος ὁ Κυρηναῖος) (fl. 270 BC), Greek poet
 Theaetetus Scholasticus (Θεαίτητος ὁ σχολαστικός) (fl. 6th century AD), Greek poet